is a Japanese volleyball player and Olympic champion.

She was a major player to help Japanese women's national volleyball team to dominate the World in 1962-67 by winning 1962 FIVB Women's World Championship, 1964 Tokyo Olympic Games and 1967 FIVB Women's World Championship in row. She also competed at the 1972 Summer Olympics.

References

External links
 Video of the moments of victory and of awarding gold medal in 1964 Tokyo Olympics

1944 births
Living people
Olympic volleyball players of Japan
Volleyball players at the 1964 Summer Olympics
Volleyball players at the 1972 Summer Olympics
Olympic gold medalists for Japan
Japanese women's volleyball players
Olympic medalists in volleyball
Medalists at the 1964 Summer Olympics
20th-century Japanese women